Focus Air Cargo was a cargo airline based in Fort Lauderdale, Florida, USA. It provided all-cargo services on wet leases.

History 
Focus Air Cargo was established as Omega Air Cargo but was renamed in March 2004.

In July 2008, the Aircraft Operating Certificate was surrendered to the FAA and the airline ceased operations, but continued to honor obligations until 2012.
Headed up by industry veteran and People Express Airlines founder David McElroy. Key managers included: David Hoffstetter, David Lagger, Frank Esopi and Greg Vanek.

Fleet 
The Focus Air cargo fleet consisted of the following aircraft (at December 2007):

3 Boeing 747-200F (2) Rolls-Royce RB-211  N361FC and N362FC (ex-Malaysian)   (1) GE CF6  N535MC  (ex-Atlas)
1 Boeing 747-300F  N354MC then N354FC  (ex-Atlas)

Destinations 
 Belgium - Brussels, Ostend
 Brazil - São Paulo, Fortaleza
 China - Hong Kong
 Colombia - Bogotá
 Costa Rica - Alajuela
 France - Paris-CDG
 Germany - Düsseldorf, Frankfurt
 Luxembourg - Luxembourg
 Malaysia - Kuala Lumpur
 Netherlands - Amsterdam, Maastricht
 Portugal - Lisbon
 Sweden - Stockholm-Arlanda, Malmo
 Switzerland  - Geneva, Zurich, Basel
 United Kingdom - Manchester, London, Glasgow
 United Arab Emirates - Sharajah, Dubai
 United States Fort Lauderdale, Miami, New York-JFK, SFO

See also 
 List of defunct airlines of the United States

References 

Airlines based in Florida
Airlines established in 2004
Airlines disestablished in 2008
Defunct cargo airlines
Companies based in Fort Lauderdale, Florida
Defunct airlines of the United States
Defunct companies based in Florida
Cargo airlines of the United States